Francesco Pona (1595–1655) was an Italian medical doctor, philosopher, Marinist poet and writer from Verona, whose works ranged from scientific treatises and history to poetry and plays.

Biography 
A Veronese medical doctor and member of many academies, Pona was a prolific writer, producing medical and scientific texts, historiography, literary translation, drama, lyric poetry, prose romances, and tales. He is best known for the horrific and macabre stories of La lucerna (The Lamp, 1625). Ormondo (1635), with its five insert-stories, offers an interesting blend of romance and novella traditions. In 1629 Pona published an Italian translation of John Barclay's Argenis.

Works
1620 Sileno overo Delle Bellezze del Luogo dell'Ill.mo Sig. Co. Gio. Giacomo Giusti. Pubblicato, con l'occasione delle Nozze de gl'Ill.mi Sig.ri Il Sig. Conte Francesco Giusti e la Signora Antonia Lazise. Angelo Tamo in Verona 1620 con licenza de' Superiori. This work brings first-hand information on Giardino all'italiana of Giardino Giusti in Verona owned by the Counts Giusti, in fact, the apothecary and botanist Francesco Pona was also gardener Counts Giusti.
1622 Il Paradiso de' Fiori overo Lo archetipo de' Giardini. Angelo Tamo in Verona 1622 con licenza de' Superiori. This manual gardening is important to know first hand how to create a Giardino all'italiana of Giardino Giusti in Verona with topiary choice and care of the plants, the garden owned by the Counts Giusti, in fact, pharmacist and botanist Francesco Pona was also gardener Counts Giusti.
1625 - La Lucerna - a dialogue reporting the imagined discussions over four evenings between a speaker-narrator and his student Eureta, allowing the author to tell a series of observations, stories, curious or memorable facts and the lives of modern, mythological or historical people, each of whom the author makes represent a specific behavioural trait or illustrate a particular moral teaching 

1631 - Il Gran contagio di Verona

References

External links
 
 

1595 births
1655 deaths
17th-century Italian physicians
Italian poets
Italian male poets
Italian dramatists and playwrights
17th-century Italian historians
Scientists from Verona
Physicians from Verona
Italian male dramatists and playwrights
Italian male non-fiction writers
17th-century Italian male writers
Baroque writers